Eastern District was a district command of the British Army from 1967 and 1995.

History

The district was formed from 54th (East Anglian) Infantry Division as part of the Territorial Army Volunteer Reserve in 1967. It had its headquarters at Colchester Garrison and was placed under the command of HQ UK Land Forces in 1972. The district merged with North East District to form an enlarged Eastern District at Imphal Barracks in 1992. The enlarged district was disbanded on the formation of HQ Land Command in 1995.

Commanders
General officers commanding included:
1967–1969 Major-General Fergus Ling
1969–1971 Major-General Jack Dye
1971–1973 Major-General David Scott-Barrett
1973–1975 Major-General Peter Hudson
1975–1977 Major-General David Tabor
1977–1980 Major-General Andrew Watson
1980–1982 Major-General Richard Gerrard-Wright
1982–1984 Major-General John MacMillan
1984–1987 Major-General Charles Ramsay
1987–1989 Major-General Peter Graham
1989–1992 Major-General William Evans
1992 Major-General Michael Walker
1992–1995 Major-General Patrick Cordingley

References

Districts of the British Army
Military units and formations established in 1967
Military units and formations disestablished in 1995